Eduardo Barrón González (2 April 1858 – 23 November 1911) was a Spanish sculptor.

Born in Moraleja del Vino, in the province of Zamora, he frequented the Instituto Provincial (of Zamora). He was granted a scholarship to study at the School of Paint, Sculpture and Engraving in Madrid in 1877. He moved to Rome to continue honing his skills in 1881. Following a brief interlude in Madrid, he returned to Rome for another spell in 1884, before his definitive instalment in Madrid in 1889.

He died in Madrid on 23 November 1911.

Works 

 Viriato, Zamora.
 Cristóbal Colón, Salamanca.
 Hernán Cortés, Medellín.
 Nerón y Séneca, Córdoba.
 Castelar, Cádiz.
 Adán después del pecado, Zamora.

References 
Citations

Bibliography
 

1858 births
1911 deaths
19th-century Spanish sculptors
19th-century Spanish male artists
Spanish male sculptors